Benz is a municipality in the Nordwestmecklenburg district, in Mecklenburg-Vorpommern, Germany.

It has about 640 inhabitants.

References

Nordwestmecklenburg